Juan Ignacio Cerda (born 25 September 1978) is a Chilean former professional tennis player.

Following a collegiate career for the University of San Diego, Cerda competed on the professional tour and reached a best singles ranking of 620 in the world. His best performances were in doubles, peaking at 185 in the rankings. He was a doubles semi-finalist at an ATP Tour tournament in Viña del Mar in 2005 and won seven ITF Futures titles.

ITF Futures titles

Doubles: (7)

References

External links
 
 

1978 births
Living people
Chilean male tennis players
San Diego Toreros men's tennis players
20th-century Chilean people
21st-century Chilean people